Aleksandar Subić (born 27 September 1993) is a Bosnian professional footballer who play as a left-back for Bosnian Premier League club Borac Banja Luka.

Club career

Early career
Subić is a product of the FK Borac Banja Luka youth academy. He made his senior debut for Borac in 2012. After Vladan Grujić moved to FK Voždovac, Subić became the first team captain for the 2015–16 season at Borac.

Partizan
Subić left Borac and signed a 4-year deal with FK Partizan, the last day of the summer 2015 transfer period, and took the jersey number 19. His first official debut for Partizan was on 23 September 2015 in a game against FK Rad. On 1 October 2015, he debuted for Partizan on the European stage in the second round of the group stage of the Europa League against German Bundesliga club FC Augsburg. Subić played well until the 64th minute when he received a second yellow and he had to left the match, but luckily for him Partizan won 1–3. Due to a red card in Augsburg, Subić missed the game in which Partizan hosted Athletic Bilbao.

By the end of the group stage of the Europa League he played 3 more matches (against AZ Alkmaar, Athletic Bilbao and Augsburg). Those performances were not good enough for Partizan so he was sent on a loan to FK Sloboda Tuzla. He came back to Partizan in the summer od 2017, but was later sent on another loan to FK Radnički Niš where he was until his loan contract expired that summer. After his loan ended, Subić again came back to Partizan, but did not play a single game in the 2018–19 season.

Borac Banja Luka
After leaving Partizan in the summer of 2019 after his contract expired, on 6 July 2019, Subić signed a two year contract with the club he started off his career at, Borac Banja Luka. In his first game since his return to Borac, the club tied 0–0 in a league match at home against FK Mladost Doboj Kakanj on 17 August 2019. Subić won his first trophy with Borac on 23 May 2021, getting crowned Bosnian Premier League champions one game before the end of the 2020–21 season.

International career
Subić was a member of the Bosnia and Herzegovina U21 national team for who made one appearance in 2013. He later played for the Republika Srpska official U23 team in an unofficial game against Serbian side FK Teleoptik, played on 15 October 2014.

Career statistics

Club

Honours
Partizan
Serbian Cup: 2015–16

Borac Banja Luka
Bosnian Premier League: 2020–21

References

External links
Aleksandar Subić stats at utakmica.rs 

1993 births
Living people
Sportspeople from Banja Luka
Serbs of Bosnia and Herzegovina
Association football fullbacks
Bosnia and Herzegovina footballers
Bosnia and Herzegovina under-21 international footballers
FK Borac Banja Luka players
FK Partizan players
FK Sloboda Tuzla players
FK Radnički Niš players
Premier League of Bosnia and Herzegovina players
Serbian SuperLiga players
Bosnia and Herzegovina expatriate footballers
Expatriate footballers in Serbia
Bosnia and Herzegovina expatriate sportspeople in Serbia